Michelle Krill Field at Historic Pullman Park is a baseball stadium located in Butler, Pennsylvania.  Constructed in 1934, and rebuilt in 2008, the ballpark hosted minor league teams that were affiliated with the New York Yankees, Cleveland Indians, Detroit Tigers, and the Pittsburgh Pirates. 

Today, there are over 400 games played at the park. High School teams such as Karns City High School, Knoch High School, Moniteau High School, North Catholic High School as well as Butler High School utilize the ballpark during their school seasons. Local colleges and universities also use Pullman Park for some of their home games. Some of these schools include Butler County Community College, Clarion University, and Penn State Greater Allegheny.  Tournaments have also been hosted by Atlantic Coast Baseball and West Penn Elite.    

The stadium's official home team tenant is the Butler BlueSox of the Tri-State Collegiate League.

History

1934–2004
Pullman Park opened for the 1934 season.  It hosted minor league baseball from the late 1930s to the early 1950s.  Notable players such as Lou Gehrig, Joe Dimaggio, and Whitey Ford played at the stadium while the Yankees farm team (Butler Yankees) was in Butler.  Joe Namath, Terry Hanratty, and Rich Saul also played at Pullman during their high school years.  The ballpark itself was named after the Pullman-Standard Company's railroad car manufacturing facility which sat adjacent to the ballpark from 1902-2005.

2005–2008 Renovation

The ballpark closed after the 2004 baseball season, and sat vacant for two years while necessary funds were raised to rebuild it.  Construction began in the fall of 2007, and work was completed in June 2008.

The New Pullman Park
On July 2, 2008, Pullman Park hosted a boxing match, televised on ESPN2. Butler native, Brian Minto knocked out John Poore 2:23 in the first round of the main fight. The match was the first major event to be hosted at the ballpark after the restoration and the first nationally televised event in Butler.

The following summer saw Pullman Park get its first major full-time baseball tenant in almost 60 years, the Prospect League's Butler BlueSox.  The BlueSox went 28(W)-26(L) during their inaugural season at the ballpark.  To date, the BlueSox have played eight full seasons at the stadium.  Pullman hosted the USCAA's Small College World Series on May 6–9, 2013, and the Prospect League All-Star Game on July 17, 2013.

Naming Rights
In 2014, it was decided to help off set costs, stadium naming rights would be sold.  In January 2014 the naming rights of Historic Pullman Park were sold to Kelly Automotive, a local car dealership owned by U.S. Rep Mike Kelly.  Kelly Automotive Park was the first naming rights to be sold for a 5 year contract.
 
In January 2019, new naming rights were obtained by a local businessman Shaun Krill of Krill Recycling, naming the park Michelle Krill Field at Historic Pullman Park.  Shaun named the field after his late wife, Michelle Krill.

References 
An Historical Gazetteer of Butler County, Pennsylvania, Mechling Bookbindery., 2006, .

Notes

External links 
Official Website
Historical Pullman Park History
Digital Ballparks page on Pullman Park
Butler BlueSox

Baseball venues in Pennsylvania
Sports venues in Pennsylvania
Buildings and structures in Butler County, Pennsylvania
Butler, Pennsylvania
Sports venues completed in 1934
1934 establishments in Pennsylvania